Mahallat (also Romanized as Maḩallāt; also known as Mahallāt Bāla and Maḩallāt-e Bālā) is the capital of Mahallat County, Markazi Province, Iran.  At the 2006 census, the city had population of 35,31910,285 families.

In ancient times it was an important location for Zoroastrianism. It has a cold climate, and strong winds during spring and summer.  The city is one of the major producers and exporters of flowers in Iran.  Every September the city holds a flower festival. In addition, the area surrounding the city is rich with travertine deposits, which are refined into tiles in nearby factories.

There are remains of Hellenistic architecture from Alexander the Great's time in Mahallat as well as fire temple ruins dated from the Zoroastrianism era. The city is famous for a large warm water spring flowing from mountains in the North into the plain areas of the South, which are used for agriculture as well as the urban water supply. There are also hot springs not far from the city which have been a source of local tourism since ancient times due to its assumed medical benefits. The dialect spoken in Mahallat is a version of a larger branch of dialects spoken in central Iran (Yazd, Isfahan, Khonsar) with several words having a noticeable connection to old Persian.

Mahallat was formerly divided into three major parts. The northern part was Mahallat-e Bala, the area of the Sadat-e Mahallat, the families descending from the prophet Mohammad. In the middle Mahallat-e Ghaleh, originally a vast open space with fields, but in the 18th century two brothers from Sabzevar and their soldiers and servants built castles and developed the area. The family was later known as Amiri, Amirkhani, Elahi, Majidi, Nasseri, Norouz Nasseri and Khosrovani (Mahallati). The southern part was named Mahallat-e Pain and this was where the Aga Khan built his huge castle.

Born in Mahallat were: the first Iranian to become a US citizen, Hajj Sayyah Mahallati, Aga Khan II, a religious leader, Mohsen Sadr (Sadr ol-Ashraf II), prime minister and senator, and General Parviz Khosrovani, deputy prime minister and founder and first president of the famous Taj Sports Club (Taj Football Club), later known as Esteghlal Football Club.

References

External links

Mahallat News 
History of Mahallat 

Populated places in Mahallat County
Cities in Markazi Province